The discography of stand-up comedian Bill Hicks.

Official albums
Dangerous (1990) Recorded 1990, Caroline's, New York City, New York
Relentless (1992) Recorded December 14–17, 1991 (Different night than film recording of same name)
Arizona Bay (1997) Recorded November 22, 1992 - June, 1993 Laff Stop, Austin, TX
Rant in E-Minor (1997) Recorded November 1992 - December 1993
Philosophy: The Best of Bill Hicks (2001) Compilation
Love, Laughter and Truth (2002) Recorded 1990-93
Flying Saucer Tour Vol. 1 (2002) Recorded June 20, 1991, Pittsburgh, Pennsylvania
Shock and Awe (2003) Abridged.  Recorded November 11, 1992, Oxford Playhouse, Oxford, England
Salvation (2005)  Unabridged.  Recorded November 11, 1992, Oxford Playhouse, Oxford, England
The Essential Collection (2010)
12/16/61 (2011) Digital EP.  Five tracks from when he was 21.
Arizona Bay Extended (2015)
Flying Saucer Tour Vol. 2 (2015.  San Ramon, California 1992.  Included in The Complete Collection)
Early Bill Hicks (2015.  Amarillo '85. Included in The Complete Collection)
Queen’s Theatre Early Show (2015.  UK tour, 1991.  Included in The Complete Collection)
Queen’s Theatre Late Show (2015.  UK tour, 1991.  Included in The Complete Collection)
Rant in E-Minor: Variations (2016)
Revelations Live In London (2017) Record Store Day 2017 Release. Recorded 29 November 1992, Dominion Theatre, London
Flying Saucer Tour Vol. 3 (2018) Recorded June 20, 1993, West Palm Beach, FL, USA.
Revelations: Variations (2019) Record Store Day 2019 Release. Extended length recording from the same performance as Revelations Live In London 2017 release.

Video releases
Sane Man (VHS: 1989; DVD: 2005; Netflix as of September 2017) (DVD includes a remastered and completely uncut version)
One Night Stand (VHS: 1991; DVD: 2002; Netflix as of January 2019)
 Ninja Bachelor Party (VHS: 1991; DVD: 2010, in The Essential Collection)
 Relentless (VHS: 1992; DVD: 2006; Netflix as of January 2019)
 Revelations (VHS: 1993; Netflix as of September 2017)
 American: The Bill Hicks Story (DVD: 2010)

Video releases in Complete Collection
Live at Comix Annex Houston ’81
Live at Comix Annex Houston ’84
Live in Indianapolis ’85
Live at Comix Annex Houston ’86 show 1
Live at Comix Annex Houston ’86 show 2
The Early Years TV Interview
The Outlaw Comics
The Outlaw Comics Interview
Sane Man
Live at Funny Firm Chicago ’89 (previously unreleased)
Live at Loonees Colorado Springs ’90 (previously unreleased)
Live at Igby’s Los Angeles ’90 (previously unreleased)
Live at Igby’s Los Angeles ’93 (previously unreleased official, also known as Bill's Last Performance)
Relentless 
Reflections (30-minute documentary played before Relentless movie in theatres from April 2015)
One Night Stand
Ninja Bachelor Party
Live at Zanies Nashville ’91 (previously unreleased)
Live at Punch Line San Francisco ’91 (previously unreleased)
Totally Bill Hicks (It's Just a Ride and Revelations)
Live at the Laff Stop Austin, November ’91 (Clips, not a full show)
Live at the Laff Stop Austin, December ’92 (Clips, not a full show)
Live at the Laff Stop Austin, June ’93 (Clips, not a full show)
Live at the Laff Stop Austin, October ’93 (Clips, not a full show)

Compilations
 Totally Bill Hicks (UK only) (VHS: 1998; DVD: 2002) (comprises the documentary It's Just a Ride and a live performance, Revelations)
 Bill Hicks Live: Satirist, Social Critic, Stand Up Comedian (DVD: 2004) (comprises One Night Stand, Relentless, "It's Just a Ride" and Revelations)
 Bill Hicks: The Complete Collection (2015) A 6 DVD and 12 CD anthology. Includes a total of 24 shows on the DVDs including 6 from previously unreleased footage. Also included are 4 previously unreleased CDs and a 48-page photo book.

Other releases
 1988: Comedy's Dirtiest Dozen (concert film)
2003: Outlaw Comic: The Censoring of Bill Hicks
 2004: Bill Hicks: Slight Return

Bootlegs
This is an incomplete list of bootlegs, which can or may never satisfy any subjective standard for completeness. Revisions and additions are welcome.

Audio bootlegs
 The Beginning (1973) (Hicks at 12 years old. The other voice is Dwight Slade, his childhood comedic partner)
 Austin, TX, USA (1989) [known as Sane Man]
 Chicago, IL, USA (1989)
 Chicago, IL, USA (1990)
 Chicago, IL, USA (1991)
 The Funny Firm, Chicago, IL, USA (1990)
 Chicago, IL, USA (1989) [known as I'm Sorry Folks, the infamous "Hicks-Loses-It" show]
 Relentless In Montreal (1992)
 Toronto, Canada (Mar. 15, 1992) [known as Dark Poet]
 Egham Hall, Surrey, England (May 16, 1992) [known as New College]
 Queen's Theatre, London, England - Early Show (May 17, 1992) 
 Queen's Theatre, London, England - Late Show (May 17, 1992)
 Brighton, England (Nov. 11, 1992)
 The Lost Hour (Oct. 5, 1993)
 Igby's, Los Angeles, CA, USA (Nov. 17, 1993) [known as Filling Up The Hump]

Video bootlegs
 Bill Hicks - Houston 1981 - At the ANNEX Comedy Club (At 20 years old)
 Bill Hicks - Houston 1984 - At the ANNEX Comedy Club (At 23 years old)
 Bill Hicks - Indianapolis 1985 (At 24 years old)
 Bill Hicks - Houston 1986 - The Early Years (At 25 years old)
 Bill Hicks - Chicago 1989 (the infamous 'Bill loses it' show - later released as I'm Sorry, Folks)
 Bill Hicks - Chicago 1990 - At The Funny Firm
 Bill Hicks - Adult Video Awards 1990
 Bill Hicks - Austin Texas Laff Stop 1993
 Bill Hicks - Los Angeles - Igby's 1993
 Bill Hicks' Last Show - Jan 5th, 1994

Audio interviews
 Comedy Hour (1988) 
 Comedy Hour (1990) 
 College Radio (1990) 
 Comedy Hour (1992) 
 Comedy Hour (1992) 
 Comedy Hour (1993) 
 The Howard Stern Show (1993)

TV interviews
 Hicks' last interview, Dave Prewitt interview on CapZeyeZ (Austin Public Access) 1993.

See also
HBO One Night Stand

Discographies of American artists
Comedian discographies